Delicious Proposal is a 2001 South Korean television series starring Jung Joon, Son Ye-jin, So Yoo-jin and So Ji-sub. It aired on MBC from February 7 to March 29, 2001 on Wednesdays and Thursdays at 21:55 for 16 episodes.

Plot
The drama is about two families that operate rival Chinese food restaurants, and the love stories of twenty-something high school graduates on their paths to becoming first-class chefs.

Hyo-dong treats his customers like kings and serves the best Chinese food in the area, but his restaurant has been struggling for some time. Built on his father's dedication and decades of hard work, the restaurant has been declining due to the aggressive techniques of their rivals. In the midst of this competition, Hyo-dong gets to know Hee-ae, a charming young girl who frequents the same cooking class. They also meet Shin-ae, a poor, very determined student who dreams of owning her own restaurant someday. Hyo-dong falls for Hee-ae, but he later finds out that she is the daughter of the owner of deluxe eatery Golden Dragon, a ruthless rival who is out to destroy his father's restaurant.

Cast
Jung Joon as Kim Hyo-dong
Son Ye-jin as Jang Hee-ae
So Yoo-jin as Ma Shin-ae
So Ji-sub as Jang Hee-moon, Hee-ae's brother
Park Geun-hyung as Kim Kap-soo, Hyo-dong's father
Kim Yong-gun as Jang Tae-kwang, Hee-ae's father
Sunwoo Yong-nyeo as Hee-ae's mother
Kim In-moon as Wang Sa-boo, chef who taught Hyo-dong's father
Kim Kyu-chul as Park Young-guk
Hong Soo-hyun as Hong Joo-ri, Hee-moon's friend
Jung Won-joong as Jo Paeng-dal, Golden Dragon chef
Lee Hye-sook as Kwon Mi-sook, Hyo-dong's aunt
Park Kwang-jung as Yoon Chil-sung, Hyo-dong's uncle
Kim Se-joon as master Chinese chef
Lee Jin-woo as Shim Woo-kyung
Ji Sung as Oh Joon-soo, Hyo-dong's friend
Kwon Sang-woo as Choon-shik, motorcycle delivery guy
Kim Ji-woo as Hyo-dong's sister
Kim Yong-hee
Seo Beom-shik

References

External links
 Delicious Proposal official MBC website 
 

MBC TV television dramas
2001 South Korean television series debuts
2001 South Korean television series endings
Korean-language television shows
South Korean romantic comedy television series
South Korean cooking television series